Gil Birmingham (born July 13, 1953) is an American actor known for his role as Tribal Chairman Thomas Rainwater in the Paramount Network's television series Yellowstone. He is also known for his portrayal of Billy Black in The Twilight Saga film series and recurring television roles as George Hunter in Banshee and Virgil White in Unbreakable Kimmy Schmidt.

Early life 
Birmingham was born in San Antonio, Texas. His father was of Comanche descent. His family moved frequently during his childhood due to his father's career in the military. Birmingham learned to play the guitar at an early age and considers music to be his "first love." After obtaining a Bachelor of Science from the USC Price School of Public Policy, he worked as a petrochemical engineer, but later decided to become an actor.

Career

Music videos
In the early 1980s, a talent scout spotted Birmingham at a local gym, where he had been bodybuilding and entering bodybuilding contests, and recruited him for his first acting experience, a music video for Diana Ross’s 1982 hit song "Muscles".

Theme parks
After that music video, Birmingham began to pursue acting as his primary career, studying with Larry Moss and Charles Conrad. He portrayed the character of Conan the Barbarian in Universal Studios Hollywood's theme park attraction The Adventures of Conan: A Sword and Sorcery Spectacular.

Television
In 1986, Birmingham made his television debut on an episode of the series Riptide. By 2002, he had a recurring role as the character Oz in the medical drama Body & Soul, starring Peter Strauss. In 2005, he was cast as the older Dogstar in the Steven Spielberg six-part miniseries Into the West. In 2018, he began portraying Chief Thomas Rainwater of the fictional Broken Rock Indian Reservation in   Paramount Network's Yellowstone, now in its fifth season.

He has appeared in a number of other television series, including "Animal Kingdom", Buffy the Vampire Slayer, Veronica Mars, 10 Items or Less, Nip/Tuck, Castle, The Mentalist, House of Cards, Unbreakable Kimmy Schmidt and Siren. He has also had roles in several television films, such as Gentle Ben (with Dean Cain) and Gentle Ben 2, Dreamkeeper, The Lone Ranger, and Love's Long Journey (with Erin Cottrell and Irene Bedard).

In 2022, Gil Birmingham was cast as Detective Bill Taba, a Paiute man and non-Latter-day Saint, in the mini- series Under the Banner of Heaven.

Films
In 2001, Birmingham appeared in his first feature film, The Doe Boy, in which he portrayed Manny Deadmarsh.

In 2008, Birmingham was cast as the character Billy Black in The Twilight Saga film series. He performed in all five of the films.

The Twilight series has led to roles in other major film roles, including that of Sheriff Johnny Cortez in Love Ranch (with Joe Pesci and Helen Mirren), and Cal Bishnik in Shouting Secrets (with The Twilight Saga: New Moon castmate Chaske Spencer). In September 2011, Birmingham appeared in the film Crooked Arrows, cast in the role of Ben Logan.

Birmingham voiced Wounded Bird in the animated film Rango and has provided voice work for the television series The Wild Thornberrys (in which he voiced an Inuit elder) and the film Night at the Museum.

He played the partnering Texas Ranger to Jeff Bridges' character in the 2016 bank robbery film Hell or High Water.

In the Chickasaw Nation production of Te Ata, Birmingham plays Thomas Benjamin 'T.B.' Thompson, Mary Frances 'Te Ata' (Thompson) Fisher's father. Birmingham attended the film's premiere in Moore, Oklahoma, on September 13, 2016.

He was featured in The Space Between Us as Shaman Neka, which was released on February 3, 2017. He was featured as the father of a girl who dies on an Arapaho reservation in the 2017 film Wind River.

In February 2021, Birmingham was cast as Charlie Bass in the Netflix thriller series Pieces of Her, adapted from the Karin Slaughter novel of the same name.

Filmography

Film

Television

Video games

Awards 
 2001: The Doe Boy (in which Birmingham starred as Manny Deadmarsh) wins the Sundance International Filmmaker's Award
 2002: First Americans in the Arts (FAITA) award for an Outstanding Performance in a Recurring Role as Oz in Body & Soul
 2005: American Indian LA Film and Television Award for Outstanding Supporting Role as Sam in Dreamkeeper

References

External links 
 
 

1953 births
20th-century American male actors
21st-century American male actors
American male film actors
American male television actors
American male voice actors
American people of Comanche descent
American male actors of Mexican descent
Living people
Male actors from San Antonio
USC Sol Price School of Public Policy alumni